El Imperio Nazza is a series of compilations by popular reggaeton producers Musicólogo & Menes "Los de la Nazza", distributed by El Cartel Records.

El Imperio Nazza (2012)

The very first volume in the series was released on January 28, 2012. A mixtape including collaborations by artists such as Daddy Yankee, Arcángel, Don Omar & Randy.

El Imperio Nazza: Gold Edition (2012)

The second volume in the series was released on June 2, 2012.

The remixes version's

Imperio Nazza: Gotay Edition (2012)

The third volume in the series was released on September 1, 2012. Unlike the first two mixtapes in the series, this mixtape starred only one artist: Gotay.

Imperio Nazza: J. Alvarez Edition (2012)

The fourth volume in the series was released on December 15, 2012. It was based around on reggaeton artist J Álvarez. This album was nominated for an Urban Album of the Year at the 26th Lo Nuestro Awards.

The Remixes Version's

Imperio Nazza: Doxis Edition (2013)

The fifth volume of the series was released on January 26, 2013. It features the reggaeton duo Jowell & Randy.

Imperio Nazza: Farruko Edition (2013)

The sixth volume of the series was released on May 26, 2013. It features the reggaeton artist Farruko.

The Remixes Version's

Imperio Nazza: King Daddy Edition (2013)

The seventh volume of the series was released on October 29, 2013. It features the reggaeton artist Daddy Yankee. At the Latin Grammy Awards of 2014, the album received a nomination for Urban Music Album. This volume received a nomination for a Lo Nuestro Award for Urban Album of the Year. King Daddy could not be considered as part of the Imperio Nazza series, because it is sold only as "King Daddy". "La Rompe Carros" music video, the producers Musicólogo & Menes made an appearance at the end of the video.

Imperio Nazza: Top Secret (2014)

The eighth volume of the series was released on August 15, 2014. It features new tracks and highly anticipated tracks that were announced in the last three years but were never released.

The remixes version's

Orion (2015)

Orion is the ninth volume from "Los De La Nazza", it was released as a two part album. The first part of the album is named "Orion: Ride of the Universe" and the second part is named "Orion: The Lost Constellation". Both were scheduled to be released on August 28, 2015. However, they were leaked on to the internet August 10, forcing Musicólogo & Menes to release them earlier than expected. The first part's musical style is based on theme park songs, often with spooky melodies. The music video for the song "Tumba La Casa", performed by Alexio "La Bestia", was released on March 26, 2015. It was the first music video for this album.

Orion: Ride of The Universe

The remixes version's

Orion: The Lost Constellation
This part of the album has more of a traditional reggaetón feel to it. The music video for the song "Lonely", performed by Farruko, was released on May 18, 2015 on Telemundo's Al Rojo Vivo and you can watch It on YouTube. This is also the second music video from this album.

Imperio Nazza: Justin Quiles Edition (2016)

The tenth volume of the series was released on January 22, 2016. It features the reggaeton artist Justin Quiles.

Imperio Nazza: Kendo Edition (2016)

The eleventh volume of the series was released on December 30, 2016. It features the reggaeton artist Kendo Kaponi.

References 

Reggaeton compilation albums
2010s mixtape albums